Katera may refer to:

Katera, Belarus, a village in Belarus
Katera of Toro, omukama of the Kingdom of Toro, from 1876 until 1877

See also
Kathera, town in Uttar Pradesh, India